The Pumpkin Walk is a free, public event held annually in October in North Logan, Utah. The Pumpkin Walk features displays created from hundreds of pumpkins by North Logan residents, and the shared theme of these displays changes from year to year.

The first Pumpkin Walk took place in North Logan resident Ida Beutler's backyard in 1983, and was already drawing 20,000 visitors by 1987. By 2013, that number had grown to more than 60,000.

History
Retired teacher Ida Beutler hosted the first version of the Pumpkin Walk on her farm during the Halloween of 1983. This first version was quite simple, just using a few pumpkins to create cheerful Halloween figures. A few young boys from the neighborhood vandalized the display, but Beutler offered them treats instead of getting angry about the destruction, and she arranged for them to help her with another display the following year. 

In 1984, the same boys helped her make the display bigger, and Beutler also brought in her own family, friends, and neighbors to help create more displays and pass out treats to guests. One friend, artist Nancy Israelson, became a co-organizer for the event; Israelson, her husband, and Beutler's husband Wallace ("Wally") continued to work on the pumpkin displays of the newly-inaugurated Pumpkin Walk for several years. Beutler's neighbors also supported the event by helping the Beutler family harvest pumpkins, by making and serving refreshments, and by creating the pumpkin-based scenes that had made the first Pumpkin Walk so popular. 

By 1989, six years after the inaugural event, the Pumpkin Walk had outgrown both the Beutler farm and the Beutlers' volunteer efforts, especially with thousands of guests now coming from across the Wasatch Front and neighboring states such as Idaho. Beutler agreed to let the city of North Logan run the Pumpkin Walk, so long as the event would always remain free to the public and wouldn't use advertising; the city agreed to her conditions and the event has continued since, moving to Elk Ridge Park in 1992 and quickly becoming an even more popular Cache Valley tradition. 

North Logan residents and event visitors have shared many photographs and memories from past Pumpkin Walks.

Today 
Over 30 years after its founding, the Pumpkin Walk regularly draws more than 30,000 visitors during its five-day run time. Hundreds of volunteers, from pumpkin carvers and painters to electricians and handymen, participate in helping create the event each year and there are many ways to get involved.

The 2020 Pumpkin Walk was a "Lite" version due to the COVID-19 pandemic. According to organizers, some photo opportunities were not offered for safety reasons; likewise, the usual treats and refreshments were not be handed out. However, the famous pumpkin scenes were still there.

Displays 
The pumpkin displays at the Pumpkin Walk use pumpkins that have been carved, painted, and left whole. Displays may be inspired by the autumn season and Halloween holiday, by popular books and movies such as Alice in Wonderland and Mary Poppins, or by the theme chosen for that particular year. 

Each year, event organizers pick a special theme for the next Pumpkin Walk. Volunteer pumpkin painters and carvers are encouraged to work with the year's theme, but creativity is always encouraged.

References

External links
 

Halloween events in the United States
Tourist attractions in Cache County, Utah
Events in Utah